Marble Peak is a mountain in Strathcona Provincial Park on Vancouver Island, British Columbia, Canada.

See also
 List of mountains in Canada

References

Vancouver Island Ranges
One-thousanders of British Columbia
Nootka Land District